This Is Your Brain on Drugs was a large-scale US anti-narcotics campaign by Partnership for a Drug-Free America (PDFA) launched in 1987, that used three televised public service announcements (PSAs) and a related poster campaign.

1987 version
The 30-second version of the first PSA, from 1987, shows a man (played by John Roselius) in a starkly furnished apartment who asks if there is anyone out there who still does not understand the dangers of drug abuse. He holds up an egg and says, "This is your brain," before motioning to a frying pan and adding, "This is drugs." He then cracks open the egg, fries the contents, and says, "This is your brain on drugs." Finally, he looks up at the camera and asks, "Any questions?"

In contrast, the 10-second and 15-second versions simply show a close-up of an egg dropping into a frying pan. This is accompanied by a voice-over saying in the 15-second version: "Okay, last time. This is drugs. This is your brain on drugs. Any questions?" The 10-second version omits the first sentence.

The PSA, titled "Frying Pan" (a.k.a. "Fried Egg" and "Any Questions?"), was conceived by art directors Scot Fletcher and Rick Bell, copywriter Larre Johnson and creative director Paul Keye at Los Angeles-based agency keye/donna/pearlstein. It was directed by Joe Pytka through his own Venice-based production company Pytka Productions and produced by agency producer Harvey Greenberg, Pytka executive producer Jane McCann and Pytka producer John Turney. Anthony Marinelli scored the shorter versions.

1997 version
The second PSA, from 1997, featured 18-year-old actress Rachael Leigh Cook, who, as before, holds up an egg and says, "this is your brain", before lifting up a frying pan with the words, "and this is heroin", after which she places the egg on a kitchen counter—"this is what happens to your brain after snorting heroin"—and slams the pan down on it. She lifts the pan back up, saying, "and this is what your body goes through", in reference to the remnants of the smashed egg now dripping from the bottom of the pan and down her arm. Cook then says, "Wait, It's not over yet", and proceeds to smash everything in the kitchen with the frying pan in a rage, yelling "this is what your family goes through! And your friends! And your money! And your job! And your self-respect! And your future!" She ends with "And your life". Cook finally drops the pan on the counter of the now-wrecked kitchen, and, back to her calmer self, says, "Any questions?"

This PSA, likewise titled "Frying Pan", was conceived by art director Doug Hill, copywriter Ken Cills and creative director Graham Turner at New York-based agency Margeotes/Fertitta & Partners. It was directed by Eden Tyler through New York-based production company Zooma Zooma, produced by agency producer Ed Kleban and Zooma Zooma producer Joseph Mantegna and edited by Jay Nelson at Santa Monica-based Avenue Edit.

2016 version
The third PSA, from 2016, is a loose remake which shows an egg in a human hand, stating "This is your brain", alongside a frying pan that the other hand is pointing to, stating, "This is drugs." The egg is then cracked and fried into the pan, with the narration, "This is your brain on drugs. Any questions?" This is followed by scenes of teens, some of whom state, "Um, yeah, I have questions", "Prescription drugs aren't as bad as street drugs, right?", "Weed's legal, isn't it?", "Drinking is worse than smoking weed. Isn't it?", "Why is heroin so addictive?", "Molly just makes you feel happy", "I have questions", "Mom, Dad, did you ever try drugs?" The narrator returns to say, "They're going to ask. Be ready."

2017 War on Drugs Critique version
In 2017, Rachael Leigh Cook used imagery from the This is Your Brain on Drugs commercials in a PSA by the Drug Policy Alliance. The PSA critiqued the war on drugs and its contribution to mass incarceration, structural racism and poverty. The ad was posted to YouTube on April 20, 2017 in recognition of 4/20.

2018 Brain on Cannabis version
In 2018, professional chef Todd Sugimoto was cast to mimic the original motions and lines from the original 1987 PSA. The concept was meant to help raise awareness on the changing laws and perception of legal cannabis. Filmed in a posh and modern apartment, the chef asks if there is anyone out there who still isn't clear on the effects of cannabis on the brain. He holds up an egg and says, "This is your brain," before motioning to a frying pan and adding, "This is cannabis." He then cracks open the egg, then a montage of skillful chopping and advanced chef techniques are shown prior to a revealing of a gourmet egg dish, as he says, "This is your brain on cannabis." Finally he looks up at the camera and asks, "Any questions?"

This version of the PSA, titled "Brain on Cannabis", was conceived by creative director Dustin Iannotti, at Las Vegas-based agency Artisans on Fire. It was edited by agency-editor Zach Honea.

Analysis
TV Guide named the commercial one of the top one hundred television advertisements of all time, and Entertainment Weekly named it the 8th best commercial of all time.

Impact

Consumerism
A poster produced in the early 1990s called "Famous Brains on Drugs" parodied the concept by having eggs appear in the frying pan in forms intended to remind the viewer of certain people. For instance, a pan labeled "Saddam Hussein" had an egg with a crosshair over it, and a pan labeled "Milli Vanilli" contained a box of imitation eggs. There have also been parody T-shirts, such as versions based on The Simpsons ("This is your brain on donuts", showing an X-ray of Homer Simpson's head) and the Yankees–Red Sox rivalry (shirts targeted to both allegiances of the famed rivalry), among others.

In media
This Is Your Brain on Drugs has been widely parodied in various forms, including a Saturday Night Live skit which parodied the PSA, adding "with a side of bacon" to the commercial's tagline.

Television
In an episode of the sitcom Roseanne, the title character reenacts the PSA while having a conversation with one of her children about drugs.

In Living Color parodied the PSA with Oprah Winfrey, played by Kim Wayans.

In the eighteenth episode of the fourth season of the sitcom Married... with Children, "What Goes Around Comes Around" (1990), the character Al Bundy takes an egg, says "This is your brain," then says "This is your brain on marriage," drops it on the ground, and asks, "Any questions?"

An episode of the teen series Beverly Hills, 90210 ends with the characters Brandon and Brenda Walsh acting out the PSA with their friends in their favorite diner. After the show, the actual 30-second commercial aired, and Jason Priestley delivered his own anti-drug message on the air.

PBS Kids did a parody of the famous PSA as well, in a short titled "This is your brain on books", in which a gold egg falls on a frying pan with books on it, then falls into a human brain, in which he thinks about composing, computing, and creating, ending it all with "Any questions?".

The second version was satirized in the series premiere of the animated television sketch show Robot Chicken, "Junk in the Trunk" (2005). Rachael Leigh Cook (who provided the voice acting) goes on a psychopathic rampage, destroying everything she encounters, ending eventually with her smashing herself in the head and falling down a building.

In the tenth episode of the second season of the TV series Breaking Bad, "Over" (2009), the character Jesse Pinkman references the commercial, frying one egg and accompanying it with "this is your brain", while adding another egg and accompanying it with "this is your brain on drugs".

In the sixteenth episode of the ABC sitcom The Goldbergs, "Muscles Mirsky", references the PSA while Beverly is making breakfast.

To promote season 2 of Riverdale on Netflix, Camila Mendes, who plays Veronica Lodge, re-stages the 1997 version PSA, which featured actor Rachael Leigh Cook. The promotion is shot-for-shot, except that a burger is used in place of an egg, and instead of talking about heroin, she talks about Jingle Jangle.

Films
In the film Batman Forever (1995), the character the Riddler parodies the commercial saying, "This is your brain on the box. This is my brain on the box. Does anybody else feel like a fried egg?!"

The 1991 film sequel Freddy's Dead: The Final Nightmare spoofed the PSA by having Johnny Depp (whose acting career began with the original A Nightmare on Elm Street movie) perform the skit. The PSA goes on as normal until Robert Englund (who plays Freddy Krueger) hits Depp with the frying pan and says, "Yeah! What are you on? Looks like a frying pan and some eggs to me."

Music
The cover of Primus' 1990 album Frizzle Fry showed a sculpture of a brain melting in a frying pan and was meant to be a play on the commercial. English virtual band Gorillaz used the PSA in the music video for their 2017 single "Sleeping Powder".

The teaser for the 2019 "No Drug Like Me" music video by Carly Rae Jepsen re-stages the 1997 version PSA, which featured actor Rachael Leigh Cook.

Books
The title of the popular science book This Is Your Brain On Music: The Science of a Human Obsession (2006) by Daniel Levitin is a nod to the PSA.

Other media
A 2011 CBS Cares PSA parodied this in talking about sunburn, which showed raw bacon that accompanied a voice saying "This is your skin", and a slice of it was then placed in a frying pan, cooking it, stating "This is your skin in the sun", and then follows it by a shot of a sun in which the voice says "Any questions?", accompanied by the phrase "Save your bacon. Use sunscreen." superimposed over the sun.

The Nostalgia Critic placed the ad at number three on his "Top 11 Drug PSAs" list, noting that everyone he knew had a "witty retort" to the commercial's signature "any questions?" After demonstrating a few comebacks, he then watches Rachael Leigh Cook's version of the PSA, responding to her manic performance with a shocked "What the hell kind of drugs are you on?"

In 2012, two PSAs based on the PDFA campaign were released by Tea Party activist Herman Cain. The violent death of a goldfish and a rabbit were supposed to represent what President Obama's stimulus plan did to the American economy.

Rob DenBlyker, one of the creators of the webcomic Cyanide and Happiness, parodied the commercial in a 2013 installment where a father, after re-enacting the commercial, admits to his son that he himself is on drugs. "But I don't see how that's relevant," he adds.

A 2021 commercial for Kraft Singles parodied the PSA as well, which showed melting butter when Alfonso Ribeiro says "This is your brain", then puts a slice of bread when he says "This is bread", followed by two slices of Kraft Singles when he says "These are delicious Kraft Singles" followed by Ribeiro saying "Any questions?" and his daughter responding with "Yes, do you have to make every meal this boring?".

In the 2005 video game Tony Hawk's American Wasteland, when the player attempts to go beyond the open world map, the game prevents them from doing so, often placing a message such as "Out of bounds!" or "Who loaned you that skateboard?". One of the messages is "This is your brain on drugs!"

Criticism
The American Egg Board took issue with the PSA, claiming that eggs were being correlated with the unhealthiness of drug use. The board worried that young children might misinterpret the TV message and believe that eggs were harmful.

Comedian Bill Hicks spoke negatively about the commercial frequently during his stand-up routine, claiming "I've seen a lot of weird shit on drugs, I've never ever ever ever ever looked at an egg and thought it was a fucking brain."

See also
Just Say No
I learned it by watching you!
Public service announcement
Partnership for a Drug-Free America
War on Drugs

References

External links
Partnership for Drug Free Kids
1997 35″
1997 30″

Public service announcements of the United States
American advertising slogans
Advertising campaigns
American television commercials
1980s television commercials
Drug policy of the United States
Anti-drugs public service announcements
1987 neologisms